Cyana saalmuelleri is a moth of the family Erebidae first described by Arthur Gardiner Butler in 1882. It is found on Madagascar.

This species is white, with two transversal red lines on the forewings.

Subspecies
Cyana saalmuelleri saalmuelleri (Butler, 1882)
Cyana saalmuelleri pauliani  (Toulgoët, 1954)

References
Butler. (1882). "Descriptions of new species of Heterocerous Lepidoptera from Madagascar". Cistula Entomologica. 3 (26): 1–27.

External links
Illustration on Hampson Plate. Catalogue of the Lepidoptera Phalaenae in the British Museum 2: plate 27, fig.18

Cyana
Moths described in 1882
Lepidoptera of Madagascar
Moths of Madagascar
Moths of Africa